The 2020 Green Party presidential primaries were a series of primary elections, caucuses and state conventions in which voters elected delegates to represent a candidate for the Green Party's nominee for President of the United States at the 2020 Green National Convention. The primaries, were held in numerous U.S. states on various dates from early spring into early summer of 2020, and featured elections publicly funded, concurrent with the Democratic Party and Republican Party primaries, and elections privately funded by the Green Party, held non-concurrently with the major party primaries.

There were 357 out of a possible 358 delegates elected to the Green National Convention, which took place over July 9 to July 12. A candidate needed a simple majority of these delegates to become the Green Party's nominee in the 2020 presidential election.

Howie Hawkins became the presumptive nominee on June 20 after passing the simple majority of delegates needed to win the nomination. Hawkins was nominated as the Green Party's presidential candidate on July 11.

Background

Former nominees
The former Green Party presidential nominees, in chronological order, are consumer advocate Ralph Nader, political activist David Cobb, congresswoman Cynthia McKinney, and political activist Jill Stein. Both Nader and Stein received the nomination for president twice from the Green Party. The former vice presidential nominees of the Green Party are environmentalist and economist Winona LaDuke, political activist Pat LaMarche, organizer and hip-hop activist Rosa Clemente, National Coordinator of the Poor People's Economic Human Rights Campaign Cheri Honkala, and human rights activist Ajamu Baraka. In 2016, LaDuke became the first Native American woman and Green Party member to receive an Electoral College vote for vice president.

The vice presidential nominees from the preceding 2016 and 2012 elections, Baraka and Honkala respectively, endorsed Howie Hawkins for president.

Candidates

This section lists candidates that have at some point been considered active by the party's Presidential Campaign Support Committee. Holding an active status does not mean the candidate has received official recognition from the party.

On July 24, 2019, the Green Party of the United States officially recognized Howie Hawkins' campaign. Nearly a month later, Dario Hunter's campaign was also recognized. In February 2020, David Rolde's campaign met the requirements for recognition.

The remaining candidates did not obtain formal recognition by meeting the established criteria by the party's Presidential Campaign Support Committee.

Popular vote counts presented here are incomplete, as many states have reported their delegates but not the corresponding popular vote.

Candidates

Withdrew before the primaries

Declined to be candidates
The following individuals were the subject of speculation as being possible candidates, but publicly denied interest in running.

 Darryl Cherney, musician and environmental activist; Green candidate for president in 2016
 Jill Stein, Lexington Town Meeting member 2005–2010; Green nominee for president in 2012 and 2016; Green nominee for Governor of Massachusetts in 2002 and 2010
Jesse Ventura, Governor of Minnesota (1999–2003); Mayor of Brooklyn Park, Minnesota (1991–1995)

Debates

The Green Party's Presidential Campaign Support Committee (PCSC) hosted a presidential forum on July 26 during the party's 2019 Annual National Meeting. All other debates and forums were organized by state Green Parties and caucuses.

Schedule

Participation

Timeline

2018
December 14: Former Maryland Green Party co-chair Ian Schlakman became the first Green Party candidate filed with the FEC to announce their presidential bid for the 2020 election, the first presidential election he qualified for.

2019
January 17: Howie Hawkins answered questions on public "Green Party Power Project" conference call on the Green New Deal, during this he announced that he was considering a run for the Green Party nomination
January 21: Rabbi and Youngstown Board of Education member Dario Hunter (then) of Ohio formed an exploratory committee.
February 18: Dario Hunter officially announced his campaign and filed his candidacy with the FEC.
April 3: Howie Hawkins formed an exploratory committee.
May 10: U.S. Army Veteran Dennis Lambert announced his campaign.
May 28: Hawkins formally launched his campaign.
June 4: Howie Hawkins filed his candidacy with the FEC
July 14: David Rolde announced his campaign.
July 19: The Green Party of Minnesota hosted the first green primary debate.
July 26: The second Green Party debate took place in Salem, Massachusetts.
July 29: Sedinam Moyowasifza-Curry announced her campaign.
August 8: Moyowasifza-Curry filed her candidacy with the FEC.
August 9: Dennis Lambert filed his candidacy with the FEC.
August 11: The third Green Party debate took place in Springfield, Missouri.
August 18: The Green National Committee decides to hold the 2020 Green National Convention in Detroit, Michigan on July 9–12.
August 19: Dennis Lambert filed his candidacy with the FEC.
August 27: David Rolde filed his candidacy with the FEC.
September 8: Chad Wilson announced his campaign.
September 20: The fourth Green Party debate took place in Muncie, Indiana.
October 18: Schlakman suspends his campaign over disputes with the Green Party
October 19: The fifth Green Party debate took place in Boise, Idaho.
December 7: The sixth Green Party debate took place in Fresno, California.
December 11: Chad Wilson filed his candidacy with the FEC.
December 14: Kent Mesplay announces his campaign.

2020
February 25: Hunter won Minnesota caucus.
February 25: Hawkins won Ohio.
March 3: Super Tuesday: Hawkins won California and North Carolina; Hunter is the winning candidate in a close race in Massachusetts (as declared by the MA Secretary of State), the no preference option received the most popular votes. Hunter announces Darlene Elias, parole officer and former Green Party Co-chair, as his running mate.
March 4: Howie Hawkins and Sedinam Moyowasifza-Curry take part in the Free & Equal elections debate held in Chicago.
March 10: Hawkins won Missouri.
March 14: Hawkins won Illinois.
April 14: Jesse Ventura submits his interest in running for president under the Green Party to the Presidential Campaign Support Committee.
April 17: Hawkins won Colorado.
April 18: Hawkins won Texas.
April 21: Hawkins won Wisconsin at popular vote, but at tie with Hunter at delegates.
April 25: Hawkins won New Mexico.
April 28: Hawkins won Pennsylvania and Utah.
May 2: Hawkins won South Carolina.
May 3: Hawkins won Arkansas. Hawkins declared winner of Pennsylvania.
May 5: Hawkins won Tennessee and announced Angela Walker as his running mate.
May 12: Hawkins won West Virginia.
May 16: Hawkins won New York.
May 17: Hawkins won Kansas.
May 23: Hunter won Hawaii. Washington primary TBA.
May 24: Hawkins won the Young Ecosocialists (YES) primary.
May 28: The Green Party of Rhode Island announces they will not endorse nor provide any ballot access efforts for any Green Party candidate in the 2020 election.
May 30: Hawkins won Florida, Maryland, and Mississippi primaries. Hunter won Idaho.
June 2: Hawkins won the District of Columbia as Montana votes no preference for their candidate.
June 6: Hawkins won Oregon.
June 9: Hawkins won Nevada.
June 12: Hunter won Maine.
June 12: Hawkins won Indiana.
June 14: Hawkins won Connecticut.
June 19: The Alaska Green Party endorses Sedinam Curry for President, and commits their delegates to her, despite not registering for the Green National Convention.
June 20: Hawkins won Michigan and the Lavender Greens primary.

Ballot access

Filing for the primaries began in October 2019.  indicates that the candidate is on the ballot for the upcoming primary contest,  indicates that the candidate is a recognized write-in candidate, and  indicates that the candidate will not appear on the ballot in that state's contest. Blanks indicate that a candidate is not yet known to be on the ballot but a final list of candidates eligible to appear on the ballot is not yet available. States that have not yet announced any candidates who are on the ballot are not included. The requirements to gain ballot access are determined either by the state government or the state party, depending on local election law.

Endorsements

Schedule and results

Campaign finance
This is an overview of the money used by each campaign as it is reported to the Federal Election Commission (FEC). Totals raised include loans from the candidate and transfers from other campaign committees.

See also
 2020 United States presidential election

National Conventions
 2020 Green National Convention
 2020 Republican National Convention
 2020 Democratic National Convention
 2020 Libertarian National Convention
 2020 Constitution Party National Convention

Presidential primaries
 2020 Republican Party presidential primaries
 2020 Democratic Party presidential primaries
 2020 Libertarian Party presidential primaries
 2020 Constitution Party presidential primaries

Notes

References